Bruce A. Kehrli (July 11, 1944 – May 12, 1996) was an American political aide who served as the White House Staff Secretary to President Richard Nixon from 1972 to 1974.

He died of multiple myeloma after a seven-year battle on May 12, 1996, in Newport Beach, California at age 51.

References

1944 births
1996 deaths
Deaths from multiple myeloma
White House Staff Secretaries
California Republicans